Francisco Pombeiro (born 14 July 1996) is a Portuguese volleyball player who plays for Sporting CP.

References

1996 births
Living people
Portuguese sportspeople
Portuguese men's volleyball players
Sporting CP volleyball players